Evann Guessand (born 1 July 2001) is a French professional footballer who plays as centre-forward for  club Nantes, on loan from Nice.

Club career
Guessand made his professional debut for Nice in a 2–0 Coupe de France win over Fréjus Saint-Raphaël on 5 January 2020.

On 12 July 2022, Guessand joined Ligue 1 club Nantes on a season-long loan. He scored his first goal for the club in a 3–1 league win over Toulouse on 28 August. On 8 September, on his UEFA Europa League debut, Guessand scored the winning goal for Nantes in the final minutes of a 2–1 home victory over Olympiacos.

International career
Born in France, Guessand is of Ivorian descent. He is a youth international for France.

Honours 
Nice

 Coupe de France runner-up: 2021–22

References

External links
 
 
 
 

2001 births
Living people
Sportspeople from Ajaccio
French footballers
France youth international footballers
French sportspeople of Ivorian descent
Association football forwards
OGC Nice players
FC Nantes players
FC Lausanne-Sport players
Ligue 1 players
Swiss Super League players
Expatriate footballers in Switzerland
French expatriate footballers
French expatriate sportspeople in Switzerland